Idiot box is slang for a television.  It may refer to:

The Idiot Box (TV series), a 1990 sketch comedy show on MTV starring Alex Winter
Idiot Box (webcomic), by Matt Bors
Idiot Box (film), an Australian movie starring Ben Mendelsohn and Jeremy Sims
"Idiot Box" (Incubus song), from the 1997 album S.C.I.E.N.C.E. by Incubus
"Idiot Box" (The Damned song), a song by The Damned on their 1977 album Music for Pleasure
"Idiot Box", a song by GOGO13 from the 2001 compilation album Rice Capades
Covered by The Aquabats on their albums The Return of The Aquabats (1996) and The Fury of The Aquabats! (1997)
"Idiot Box" (SpongeBob SquarePants), an episode of SpongeBob SquarePants
"The Idiot Box", a song from the album The Art of Balance by Shadows Fall

Dysphemisms